George Robert James Sykes (born 14 September 1994) is an English footballer who plays for Aveley as a forward.

Club career
Sykes joined the Barnet youth team as an under-16 from hometown club Buckhurst Hill and was top scorer in the English U-18 youth system in the 2011–12 season with 24 goals. He made his senior debut at the age of 17 against Bristol Rovers on 21 August 2012. Sykes signed his first professional contract with the Bees in November 2012. He won the League Two Apprentice of the Year award at the Football League Awards in March 2013. On 15 August 2013, he joined Bishop's Stortford on loan.

On his return to Barnet in November, Sykes came on as substitute at home to Cambridge United. With the score at 2–2, Sykes put the ball in the net in injury time after it had dropped from a cloud of smoke caused by a smoke bomb, obscuring the view of the assistant referee, who controversially disallowed the goal, claiming the ball had gone out of play, and Sykes was denied his first goal for Barnet. His first goal for Barnet came on 30 November, when he scored an 89th minute acrobatic winner in an FA Trophy first round tie against Hayes & Yeading United.

Sykes joined Farnborough on loan on 31 January 2014, along with Jon Nurse. On 13 March, he joined St Albans City on loan until the end of the season, and was part of the team that won the Southern Football League Premier Division play-offs.

Sykes re-joined Bishop's Stortford on loan on 22 August 2014 until 1 January. Two weeks after his return from loan, he went out on loan for a fifth time, at Canvey Island.

Sykes joined Dartford on a free transfer in June 2015. After scoring only one goal in the National League South in the entire 2015–16 season, Sykes rejoined Canvey Island for 2016–17.

On 15 June 2017, after an impressive campaign with Canvey Island, Sykes joined National League South side Braintree Town.

On 20 July 2017, it was announced that Sykes had rejoined Canvey Island despite only recently signing for Braintree. Sykes joined Maldon & Tiptree in September 2018, before joining Tilbury in November. He then left in October 2019 to join Aveley.

International career
In September 2012, Sykes was called up by Ricky Sbragia to the Scotland U-19 training camp ahead of qualifying games against Armenia, Romania and Switzerland in October 2012.

Career statistics

References

External links

1994 births
Living people
Association football forwards
English footballers
Scottish footballers
Barnet F.C. players
Bishop's Stortford F.C. players
Farnborough F.C. players
St Albans City F.C. players
Canvey Island F.C. players
Dartford F.C. players
Braintree Town F.C. players
Maldon & Tiptree F.C. players
Tilbury F.C. players
Aveley F.C. players
English Football League players
National League (English football) players
Isthmian League players
Southern Football League players
People from Buckhurst Hill